Koldher Fort is a fort located  from chandwad, Nashik district, of Maharashtra. This fort is close to the Rajdher fort and lies westwards. It requires about 1-2 hours to reach the fort from Rajdher.

History
The history of the fort is similar to that of Rajdher fort.Captain Briggs visited this fort after it surrendered to British forces by Maratha Army along with other 17 forts after the fall of Trymbak fort in 1818.Captain Briggs described this fort as poor stronghold.

How to reach
The nearest town is Chandwad which is 66 km from Nashik. The base village of the fort is Rajdeherwadi which is 11 km from Chandwad. There are good hotels at Chandwad. The trekking path starts from the hillock west of the Rajdeherwadi. The route is very safe and wide. There are no trees on the trekking route. It takes about two hours to reach the ascent of the fort. The path leading to Koldher is southwards from the Rajdher fort.

Places to see
The fort is large but easy to ascent. There is hardly few structures left on the fort. There are good rock-cut granaries and store houses on the fort. There is no water available on the fort.

See also 
 List of forts in Maharashtra
 List of forts in India
 Marathi People
 Maratha Navy
 List of Maratha dynasties and states
 Maratha War of Independence
 Battles involving the Maratha Empire
 Maratha Army
 Maratha titles
 Military history of India
 List of people involved in the Maratha Empire

References 

Buildings and structures of the Maratha Empire
Forts in Nashik district
16th-century forts in India